The Clough Formation is a geologic formation in western New Hampshire. It preserves fossils dating back to the Silurian period. Prominent exposures include along the ridges of Croydon Mountain, Moose Mountain, Smarts Mountain, and Mount Cube.

See also

 List of fossiliferous stratigraphic units in New Hampshire
 Paleontology in New Hampshire

References

 

Silurian geology of New Hampshire
Geologic formations of New Hampshire
Silurian southern paleotemperate deposits